Angelos Siamandouras (alternate spelling: Aggelos) (born 1980) is a Greek professional basketball player. He is 2.08 m (6'10") in height, and he plays at the center position.

Professional career
Siamandouras started his club career with the Greek club Panellinios (2000–01), and he subsequently played with the following Greek clubs: Panelefsiniakos (2001–02), Maroussi (2003–05), Nea East (2005–06), Sporting (2006–07), Iraklis (2007–08), Peristeri (2008–09), Aigaleo (2009–10), back to Maroussi (2010–11), AEK Athens (2011–13), and Kymis (2013–15).

National team career
Siamandouras played with the Greek under-26 national team at the 2005 Mediterranean Games.

External links
Eurobasket.com Profile
AEK.com Bio

1980 births
Living people
AEK B.C. players
Aigaleo B.C. players
Centers (basketball)
Competitors at the 2005 Mediterranean Games
Greek men's basketball players
Iraklis Thessaloniki B.C. players
Kymis B.C. players
Near East B.C. players
Maroussi B.C. players
Mediterranean Games medalists in basketball
Mediterranean Games silver medalists for Greece
Panellinios B.C. players
Peristeri B.C. players
Sporting basketball players
Basketball players from Athens